Vicious Pink is the first and only studio album by the English new wave duo Vicious Pink, released in 1986 by Capitol Records. The singles, "Cccan't You See" and "Fetish"/"Spooky", reached No. 67 and No. 87 on the UK Singles Chart, respectively.

Track listing
"Cccan't You See" (Brian Moss, Josie Warden) – 3:25
"Spooky" (Harry Middlebrooks, Mike Shapiro, Buddy Buie, James Cobb) – 3:17
"The Spaceship is Over There" (Moss, Warden) – 4:19
"Blue" (Love Mix) (Moss, Warden) – 3:17
"Fetish" (Moss, Warden) – 3:18
"Take Me Now" (John David) – 3:58
"Always Hoping" (Moss, Warden) – 3:54
"8:15 to Nowhere" / "Great Balls of Fire" (Jack Hammer, Otis Blackwell, Moss) – 4:51
"Cccan't You See" (Exxx-tended Re-Mixxx) (Moss, Warden) – 6:00

References

External links 
 

1986 debut albums
Vicious Pink albums
Capitol Records albums